Visitors from the Galaxy is a 1981 Yugoslav-Czechoslovak film directed by Dušan Vukotić.

Plot
Robert is a hotel doorman who is obsessed with science fiction. He plans to write an SF novel about three alien androids—Andra and children Targo and Ulu—who land on Earth coming from an advanced civilisation from the galaxy of Arkana. He is constantly disrupted by his girlfriend Biba and his neighbour Tino, a photographer. One of his colleagues at work tells him he should add a monster to his story, saying it is the only way to attract the readers' attention. Robert decides to partially follow his advice, adding the character of Mumu, a huge alien pet.

One night, Robert hears a woman's voice on a tape recorder, telling him to go to a nearby island. He borrows a boat from his friend Toni and arrives at the island, where he is surprised to find the aliens from his own story. After he returns home, he talks about the events with his psychiatrist. He adds that he discovered he has "tellurgia", an ability to make his thoughts come true; he learned about it when he was a baby wishing for milk, and his father grew breasts in order to feed him. Biba does not believe Robert, so he takes her to the island the following night. There they find again the three aliens. The aliens are in their spaceship, which resembles a blue glowing sphere. They observe a sleeping guard and remove his heart. Biba is frightened by the events, so they turn her into a cube. Once back home, she turns back into a human in a state of shock.

As the city finds out about the aliens, a group of scuba divers goes to the island armed with harpoons, but are attacked by Targo, who shoots laser rays from his eyes. This greatly increases the public interest in the aliens—tourists flock en masse to the island, arriving naked to convince the aliens they mean no harm. However, they find the island empty. Toni also stalks the aliens with a camera to no avail. Robert is fired from his job. Coming home, he finds the aliens nested there. He is fascinated by Andra, and touches her skin, but a jealous Biba bursts into the room, swearing at Andra. Mumu breathes fire at guests in the house, killing several. In the end, Robert leaves Earth with the aliens.

Cast
Žarko Potočnjak as Robert
Lucié Žulova as Biba
 as Andra
Rene Bitorajac as Targo
Ljubiša Samardžić as Toni
 as Gabi
Cvijeta Mesić as Cecille
Petr Drozda as Mumu

Reception
The film was nominated for the Best Film award and received the Best Screenplay award at the 1984 Fantasporto festival in Portugal.

References

External links

Visitors from the Galaxy at Filmski-Programi.hr

1981 films
1981 horror films
1980s science fiction comedy films
1980s Croatian-language films
Films directed by Dušan Vukotić
Yugoslav science fiction comedy films
Croatian science fiction comedy films
Czech science fiction comedy films
Czechoslovak science fiction comedy films
Czechoslovak multilingual films
Yugoslav multilingual films
1981 multilingual films
1981 comedy films